Allan Jay Silverman (born 1955) is an American philosopher and Professor of Philosophy at the Ohio State University. He is also a Faculty Fellow at Mershon Center for International Security Studies.
Silverman is known for his expertise on ancient philosophy.

Books
 The Dialectic of Essence: A Study of Plato's Metaphysics, Princeton University Press, 2003

References

External links
Allan Silverman at the Ohio State University

21st-century American philosophers
Philosophy academics
Ohio State University alumni
Ohio State University faculty
Living people
1955 births
Scholars of ancient philosophy
University of California, Berkeley alumni
Metaphysicians